Troublesome Creek is a  long 3rd order tributary to the Haw River, in Rockingham County, North Carolina.

Variant names
According to the Geographic Names Information System, it has also been known historically as:  
Big Troublesome Creek

History
Troublesome Creek was the location of Native American activity (Cheraw Indians) in the Middle Archaic period and may have been the location of the first European settlement in Rockingham County, North Carolina.
The watershed was the site of the Troublesome Creek Iron Works, also known as Speedwell Furnace.  Established in 1770, it is considered one of the earliest colonial ironworks. General Nathaniel Greene also camped here during the Guilford Courthouse campaign in 1781. 
President George Washington also later visited the ironworks in 1791.

Course
Troublesome Creek rises in the City of Stokesdale in Guilford County on the divide between Troublesome Creek and Belews Creek (Dan River).  Troublesome Creek then flows northeast into Rockingham County and then southeast to meet the Haw River about 5 miles south of Reidsville, North Carolina.  Lake Reidsville is an impoundment of this stream.

Watershed
Troublesome Creek drains  of area, receives about 46.5 in/year of precipitation, has a topographic wetness index of 426.23 and is about 42% forested.

Natural History
The Rockingham County Natural Heritage Inventory recognized three locations in the Troublesome Creek watershed, all of which are county significant.  These include 1) Bottomlands of Troublesome Creek, 2) Troublesome Creek Marsh, and 3) Warf Airfield Marsh.

See also
List of rivers of North Carolina

References

External links
 Historic Marker about Troublesome Iron Works
 Piedmont Trails Article on Troublesome Creek
 Master Thesis on Troublesome Creek Ironworks "A LANDSCAPE ANALYSIS AND CULTURAL RESOURCE INVENTORY OF TROUBLESOME CREEK IRONWORKS: A GEOGRAPHICAL AND ARCHAEOLOGICAL APPROACH"

Rivers of North Carolina
Rivers of Guilford County, North Carolina
Rivers of Rockingham County, North Carolina